Star Wars: Return of the Jedi is a 1984 arcade game by Atari, Inc. and the  follow-up to 1983's Star Wars arcade game. The game, which was the second arcade release by Atari based on the Star Wars franchise, uses raster graphics rather than the vector graphics used in the first and third arcade games. Several home ports were released by Domark for the Amstrad CPC, ZX Spectrum, Atari ST, Commodore 64, and Amiga in 1988.  The game is included as an unlockable extra on Star Wars Rogue Squadron III: Rebel Strike for GameCube.

Gameplay

The player takes control of three different vehicles in stages based upon the Return of the Jedi film. Gameplay is from a 3/4 isometrically projected perspective and is broken into several stages. In the first stage, the player pilots a speeder bike to the Ewok village. The next stage involves piloting the Millennium Falcon to destroy a reactor. Another speeder bike stage follows. The final stage involves piloting both an AT-ST and the Millennium Falcon in rapid succession in a fight against a Star Destroyer.

Reception 
In Japan, Game Machine listed Star Wars: Return of the Jedi on their February 15, 1985 issue as being the sixth most-successful upright/cockpit arcade unit of the month.

See also
 Return of the Jedi: Death Star Battle, an earlier video game by Parker Brothers based on the film

References

External links

Return of the Jedi at the Arcade History database
Return of the Jedi  at The GameRoom Blog

1984 video games
Amstrad CPC games
Amiga games
Atari arcade games
Atari ST games
BBC Micro and Acorn Electron games
Commodore 64 games
Return of the Jedi (1984 video game)
Return of the Jedi (1984 video game)
Return of the Jedi video games
Video games developed in the United States
Video games featuring female protagonists
Video games set in forests
Video games with isometric graphics
Domark games
Single-player video games